Sławomir Zgrzywa (born 8 April 1962 in Łomża) is a Polish right-wing politician, local government official and historian. He served as voivode for the Łomża Voivodeship, and as Voivodeship marshal for the Podlaskie Voivodeship.

Biography 
After graduating from high school, Zgrzywa studied history at the Faculty of Humanities of the Białystok branch of the University of Warsaw.

Initially employed as a teacher in elementary school, he later joined the State Service of Monuments in Łomża. In 1997–1998 he held the position of Łomżyński voivode (the last in the history of this province). Then, until 2002, he was the Voivodeship marshal of the Podlasie province. From 1998 to 2006, he was also a member of the Podlasie regional council, serving two terms before being defeated in the subsequent local government elections.

Associated with the Solidarity Electoral Action party, from 2002 to 2014 he was active in the right-wing party Civic Platform, and was elected to the regional authorities of this party. He was an unlucky candidate in the snap elections to the Senate in 2003. In 2014, he ran for president and councilor of Łomża, also without success.

Zgrzywa currently works as a senior inspector at the Provincial Office for the Protection of Monuments.

Bibliography 
 Kto nami rządzi (1), Gazeta Wyborcza no 73, 27 March 1998

1962 births
University of Warsaw alumni
Solidarity Electoral Action politicians
Civic Platform politicians
Living people
Voivodeship marshals of Poland
Podlaskie Voivodeship